7 Minutes is a 2016 Italian-Swiss-French drama film co-written and directed by  Michele Placido.

The film premiered at the 11th Rome Film Festival and was later screened at the Tokyo International Film Festival. Inspired by a true story, it is loosely based on a drama play of the same name by Stefano Massini.

Plot
A textile company is acquired by a foreign multinational corporation. The new owner seems intent on not making redundancies but asks the workers to sign a particular clause that provides for the 7-minute reduction of lunch time. The development of the debate among the workers will bring each one of them to a phase of profound reflection.

Cast 

Ottavia Piccolo as Bianca
Cristiana Capotondi as  Isabella
Ambra Angiolini  as  Greta
Fiorella Mannoia as  Ornella
Violante Placido as  Marianna
Clémence Poésy as  Hira
Maria Nazionale as Angela
 Balkissa Maiga as Kidal
Sabine Timoteo as  Micaela
 Luisa Cattaneo as Sandra
 Erika D'Ambrosio as  Alice
Anne Consigny as  Madame Rochette
Michele Placido as Michele Varazzi

See also
 List of Italian films of 2016

References

External links

2016 drama films
Italian drama films
French films based on plays
Films directed by Michele Placido
Swiss drama films
French drama films
Plaion
2010s Italian-language films
2010s French films
2010s Italian films